HMS Triton's Prize was a 30-gun French privateer, Le Royal of St Malo taken by HMS Triton on 3 February 1705. She was purchased on 3 March 1705. She was commissioned into the Royal Navy in 1705 for service in the English Channel. She went to the American colonies of New York and Virginia, remaining there until sold in 1703.

Triton's Prize (actually spelt Tryton's Prize, Tryton or Triton) was the second named ship since it was used for a 42-gun fifth rate captured from the French in October 1702 and sold at Woolwich on 4 October 1709.

Specifications
She was captured on 3 February and purchased on 3 March 1705. Her tonnage calculation was  tons. Her armament was twenty-six 6-pounders on the upper deck with and four 3-pounders on the quarterdeck all on wooden trucks.

Commissioned Service
She was commissioned in 1705 under the command of Commander Thomas Miles, RN for service in the English Channel. She was assigned to the American colonies in 1706 sailing for New York. In 1707 Commander Coningsby Norbury, RN took command followed by Commander Richard Girlington, RN in 1709 sailing to Virginia in 1710 and 1711. On 27 February 1713 Captain Pace, RN took over command followed by Captain Francis Hume, RN on 24 July 1713.

Disposition
She was sold on 26 November 1713.

Citations

References
 Winfield, British Warships in the Age of Sail (1603 – 1714), by Rif Winfield, published by Seaforth Publishing, England © 2009, EPUB , Chapter 6, The Sixth Rates, Vessels acquired from 18 December 1688, Sixth Rates of 20 guns and up to 26 guns, Ex-French Prizes (1704–09), Triton's Prize
 Colledge, Ships of the Royal Navy, by J.J. Colledge, revised and updated by Lt Cdr Ben Warlow and Steve Bush, published by Seaforth Publishing, Barnsley, Great Britain, © 2020, e  (EPUB), Section S (Triton's Prize)

 

1700s ships
Corvettes of the Royal Navy
Naval ships of the United Kingdom